The 1993–94 OHL season was the 14th season of the Ontario Hockey League. Sixteen teams each played 66 games. The North Bay Centennials won the J. Ross Robertson Cup, defeating the Detroit Junior Red Wings.

Regular season

Final standings
Note: DIV = Division; GP = Games played; W = Wins; L = Losses; T = Ties; GF = Goals for; GA = Goals against; PTS = Points; x = clinched playoff berth; y = clinched division title;

Leyden Division

Emms Division

Scoring leaders

Playoffs

Division quarter-finals

Leyden Division

(2) Ottawa 67's vs. (7) Peterborough Petes

(3) Sudbury Wolves vs. (6) Oshawa Generals

(4) Belleville Bulls vs. (5) Kingston Frontenacs

Emms Division

(2) Sault Ste. Marie Greyhounds vs. (7) Windsor Spitfires

(3) Guelph Storm vs. (6) London Knights

(4) Owen Sound Platers vs. (5) Kitchener Rangers

Division semi-finals

Leyden Division

(1) North Bay Centennials vs. (4) Belleville Bulls

(2) Ottawa 67's vs. (3) Sudbury Wolves

Emms Division

(1) Detroit Junior Red Wings vs. (4) Owen Sound Platers

(2) Sault Ste. Marie Greyhounds vs. (3) Guelph Storm

Division finals

Leyden Division

(1) North Bay Centennials vs. (2) Ottawa 67's

Emms Division

(1) Detroit Junior Red Wings vs. (2) Sault Ste. Marie Greyhounds

J. Ross Robertson Cup

(L1) North Bay Centennials vs. (E1) Detroit Junior Red Wings

Awards

All-Star teams
The OHL All-star teams were selected by the OHL's general managers.

First team
Jason Allison, Centre, London Knights
Jeff Shevalier, Left Wing, North Bay Centennials
Kevin Brown, Right Wing, Detroit Jr. Red Wings
Jamie Rivers, Defence, Sudbury Wolves
Nick Stajduhar, Defence, London Knights
Jamie Storr, Goaltender, Owen Sound Platers
Bert Templeton, Coach, North Bay Centennials

Second team
Keli Corpse, Centre, Kingston Frontenacs
Bob Wren, Left Wing, Detroit Jr. Red Wings
Jason MacDonald, Right Wing, Owen Sound Platers
Drew Bannister, Defence, Sault Ste. Marie Greyhounds
Ed Jovanovski, Defence, Windsor Spitfires
Matt Mullin, Goaltender, Sudbury Wolves
Paul Maurice, Coach, Detroit Jr. Red Wings

Third team
Michael Peca, Centre, Ottawa 67's
Ethan Moreau, Left Wing, Niagara Falls Thunder
Vitali Yachmenev, Right Wing, North Bay Centennials
Jason Gladney, Defence, Kitchener Rangers
Brad Brown, Defence, North Bay Centennials
Sandy Allan, Goaltender, North Bay Centennials
Jerry Harrigan, Coach, Owen Sound Platers

1994 OHL Priority Selection
The Sarnia Sting held the first overall pick in the 1994 Ontario Priority Selection and selected Jeff Brown from the Thornhill Islanders. Brown was awarded the Jack Ferguson Award, awarded to the top pick in the draft.

Below are the players who were selected in the first round of the 1994 Ontario Hockey League Priority Selection.

See also
List of OHA Junior A standings
List of OHL seasons
1994 Memorial Cup
1994 NHL Entry Draft
1993 in sports
1994 in sports

References

HockeyDB

Ontario Hockey League seasons
OHL